Power and Love is the debut album by Manchild.

Chart performance
Released in 1977, Power and Love peaked at #29 on the Billboard R&B albums chart.

Track listing
Red Hot Daddy - (Anthony Johnson, Kevin Ferrell, Reggie Griffin)  3:25	
(I Want to Feel Your) Power and Love - (Charles Bush, Sid Johnson)  3:46		 	
Especially for You - (Charles Bush)  6:06	 	
Takin' It to the Streets - (Michael McDonald) 4:04	 	
You Get What You Give - (Anthony Johnson, Kevin Ferrell)  2:31	
We Need We - (Reggie Griffin)  4:06	
These Are the Things That Are Special to Me - (Kenneth Edmonds, Daryl Simmons) 3:37	 	
Funky Situation - (Kenneth Edmonds)  5:46

Personnel
Kenny Edmonds - Acoustic Guitar, Rhythm Guitar, Handclaps, Lead and Backing Vocals
Daryl Simmons - Congas, Bongos, Percussion, Handclaps, Backing Vocals
Reggie Griffin - Tenor & Soprano Saxophone, Guitar, Clavinet, Acoustic Piano, Handclaps, Backing Vocals
Charles "Chuckie" Bush - Fender Rhodes Electric Piano, Piano, Synthesizer, Strings (Ensemble), Handclaps, Lead and Backing Vocals
Kevin Ferrell - Lead and Backing Vocals, Handclaps
Robert Parson - Drums, Handclaps
Anthony Johnson - Bass (Guitar, Mu-tron), Handclaps
Harold Gooch - Rhythm Guitar, Backing Vocals
Dwayne Johnson, Thomas Henderson - Handclaps

Charts

Singles

External links
 Manchild-Power And Love at Discogs

References

1977 debut albums
Soul albums by American artists